Events of the year 2019 in Belgium.

Incumbents 

Monarch: Philippe
Prime Minister: Charles Michel (to 27 October); Sophie Wilmès (from 27 October)

Events 
 1 January — Fifteen Flemish municipalities merge into seven, the first such merges for several decades
 January —  A ban on Kosher and halal slaughter comes into effect in the Flanders region of Belgium. The northern region of Belgium is the first to implement the ban. Similar restrictions will be in place in the southern Wallonia region from September.
 26 May – European elections, regional elections and federal election
 29 May – King Philippe held an official meeting with the leader of the nationalist Vlaams Belang party, Tom Van Grieken. According to Belgian media, 1936 was the last time a far-right leader had had an official meeting with the king.
 25 July – The hottest day on record in Belgium, with a temperature of 39.7 °C measured at the Royal Meteorological Institute in Uccle and of 41.8 °C in Begijnendijk.
 27 October – Sophie Wilmès appointed head of caretaker government: Belgium's first female Prime Minister.
 27 November – Lode Van Hecke, Abbot of Orval, named bishop of Ghent in succession to Lucas Van Looy.

Culture
 20 May – Dardenne brothers film Young Ahmed screened at 2019 Cannes Film Festival, winning them Best Director award.
 21 May – Plans to build microbrewery inside Grimbergen Abbey publicised.

Deaths 

January
 4 January – Wiet Van Broeckhoven, 69, radio presenter and writer.
 18 January – Etienne Vermeersch, 84, moral philosopher.

February
 13 February – Willy Willy, rock musician with The Scabs, dies at age 59.
 17 February – Claude Renard, 72, comics artist (Ivan Casablanca, 1914-1918, Les Anges de Mons) and teacher (founder of Atelier R).
 18 February – Bob Van Der Veken, TV actor (De Collega's), dies at age 95.

March
 14 March – Godfried Danneels, 85, cardinal Metropolitan Archbishop of Mechelen-Brussels and the chairman of the episcopal conference.

April
 19 April – Patrick Sercu, 74, cyclist.

May
 26 May – Alexis Dragonetti, 50, publisher.

July
 17 July – Robert Waseige, 79, association football trainer.

August
 4 August – André Goosse, 93, linguist.
 5 August – Bjorg Lambrecht, 22, cyclist.
 9 August – José Desmarets, 93, politician.

September
 5 September – Charles Jarry, 66, comics artist (Élodie d'Avray, Costa).

October
 5 October
 Rik Pareit, 66, journalist and writer.
 Philippe Vandevelde, aka Philippe Tome, 62, comics writer (Le Petit Spirou, Soda, continued Spirou et Fantasio) and artist (assistant of Dupa, Turk and Bob de Groot).
 22 October – Marieke Vervoort, 40, athlete.
 23 October – Michel Nihoul, Belgian criminal (Dutroux affair), dies at age 78.

November
 22 November – Gaston Durnez, 91, journalist, poet, writer and comics writer (De Geschiedenis van Sleenovia, came up with the name of the comics character Detective Van Zwam by Marc Sleen).

December
 7 December – Dani Dacquin, 84, comics artist (Adam en Eva, De Lotgevallen van Lotje, Yoeko).
 14 December – Panamarenko, 79, sculptor.
 22 December – Freek Neirynck, 70, theatre director, journalist, actor, writer and comics writer.
 30 December – André Smets, 76, politician.

See also

 2019 European Parliament election

References

Links
 

 
Years of the 21st century in Belgium
2010s in Belgium
Belgium
Belgium